Michael Rowland Stanley  (born 6 November 1957) is a New Zealand sports administrator and former rower. He represented New Zealand at the 1984 Los Angeles Olympics. Stanley has since 2009 been the president of the New Zealand Olympic Committee.

Early life
Stanley was born in 1957 in Lower Hutt. Stanley and his three brothers all attended Westlake Boys High School, where he was from 1971 to 1975. He captained the 1st Rugby XV for three of those years, and was a member of the school's senior rowing eight team in 1974 and 1975.

Rowing career
He was chosen for the coxed four for the 1980 Moscow Olympics, but New Zealand did not attend the games due to the boycott. At the 1981 World Rowing Championships at Oberschleißheim outside Munich in Germany, he was a member of the New Zealand eight, which won the B final. At the 1982 World Rowing Championships at Rotsee, Switzerland, he won a gold medal with the New Zealand eight in the stroke seat. At the 1983 World Rowing Championships at Wedau in Duisburg, Germany, he won a gold medal with the New Zealand eight in the stroke seat. At the 1984 Los Angeles Olympics, he was a member of the New Zealand eight that came fourth. He retired after the 1984 Olympic Games from competitive rowing.

Awards
In 1982, the 1982 rowing eight crew was named sportsman of the year. The 1982 team was inducted into the New Zealand Sports Hall of Fame in 1995.

Post rowing career
From 1988 to 1994, Stanley was Sports Master for Westlake Boys High School. He coached the rowing team, and the Westlake boat won the Springbok Shield in 1989 and 1991, with his school coming second in the Maadi Cup in both those years. He returned to the school in 2004 as a rowing coach. Stanley was chief executive of Rowing New Zealand from 1994 to 2003. He remained on the board of the organisation until 2009. From 2005, he was a member of the New Zealand Olympic Committee, and since 2009, he has been president of the organisation, when he succeeded Sir Eion Edgar.

Family
Stanley is married to Jane, and they have three children.

References

|-

1957 births
Living people
New Zealand male rowers
Sportspeople from Lower Hutt
People educated at Westlake Boys High School
Rowers at the 1984 Summer Olympics
Olympic rowers of New Zealand
World Rowing Championships medalists for New Zealand
Companions of the New Zealand Order of Merit